Papilio rumanzovia, the scarlet Mormon or red Mormon, is a butterfly of the family Papilionidae. It is found in the Philippines but has been recorded as a vagrant to southern Taiwan.

The species was named by Johann Friedrich von Eschscholtz after Nicholas Rumanzow, chancellor of the Russian Empire. It has traditionally been regarded as a species of its own rather than a subspecies of Papilio deiphobus, but the former treatment is still preferred by some.

The wingspan is 120–140 mm. The male resembles the male Papilio ascalaphus, but lacks the tail at the bottom wing and has large red patches on the ventral side (underside) of the wings. In contrast, the female has distinct red markings on both sides of the wings.

The larvae feed on Citrus species.

References

External links

Butterflycorner.net

rumanzovia
Lepidoptera of the Philippines
Butterflies of Asia
Endemic fauna of the Philippines
Butterflies described in 1821
Taxa named by Johann Friedrich von Eschscholtz